Wyman House may refer to:

Fowle-Reed-Wyman House, Arlington, Massachusetts
Francis Wyman House, Burlington, Massachusetts
Otis-Wyman House, Somverville, Massachusetts
George Wyman House, Winchester, Massachusetts
Wyman-Rye Farmstead, Clinton, Wisconsin, listed on the National Register of Historic Places